이상화 (isanghwa) may refer to:

 Yi Sang-hwa (1901–1943),  "李相和", Korean poet
 Lee Sang-hwa (born 1989), a.k.a. "李相花", South Korean Olympic long track speedskater

See also 

 이 (李), a.k.a. Lee/Yi